Ding Yi (born 14 January 1959) is a Chinese-born table tennis player who represented Austria at the 1988, 1992, 1996, and 2000 Olympics.

References

Sources

1959 births
Living people
Table tennis players from Shanghai
Austrian male table tennis players
Chinese emigrants to Austria
Chinese male table tennis players
Table tennis players at the 1988 Summer Olympics
Table tennis players at the 1992 Summer Olympics
Table tennis players at the 1996 Summer Olympics
Table tennis players at the 2000 Summer Olympics
Olympic table tennis players of Austria
Naturalised table tennis players
Austrian sportspeople of Chinese descent